Johannes Musaeus (7 February 1613 – 4 May 1681) was a German Protestant theologian.

Education
After visiting the Latin school in Arnstadt he studied at the University of Erfurt starting from 1633 in the Arts Faculty and in Jena with Damiel Stahl. In 1634 he received the Magister Artium, studying theology under Georg Grosshain, producing a thesis entitled: Disputatio Apologetica In qua Germanica B. Lutheri versio adversus Georgium Holzaium Jesuitam Ingolstad. defenditur In causa De Cultu Divino Enoschi. In 1643 he became professor of history and poetry. He obtained a doctorate to 1646 in theology and changed to the Theological Faculty.

Career
He fought against the catholic controversial theologians V. Erbermann, J. Kedde, and Jacobus Masenius, and positioned himself against Socinianism. He was founder of the Jenenser Richtung followed by orthodox Lutherans.

Books by Musaeus
 Disquisitio philologica de stylo Novi Testamenti, 1641, Jena
 De usu principiorum rationis et philosophiae in controversiis theologicis libri III, 1644, Jena
 Disputatio de aeterno dei decreto an absolutum sit, 1646, Jena
  Verteidigung des unbeweglichen Grundes, dessen der Augsburgischen Confession verwandte Lehrer zum Beweis ihrer Kirchen sich gebrauchen, 1654, Jena
 Tractatus theologicus de conversione hominis peccatoris ad Deum, 1661, Jena
  Biblia Lutheri auspiciis Ernesti Ducis. .. glossis ac interpretationibus illustrata, a Viti Erbermanni iterata maledicentia vindicata, 1663, Jena

References 
 Carl Stange: Zur Theologie des Musäus, 1897
 Otto Ritschl: Dogmengeschichte des Protestantismus IV, 1927
 Hans Leube: Kalvinismus und Luthertum I, 1928, 347 ff.

External links
 Musaeus' math genealogy
 
 
 Union, Konversion, Toleranz: Kolloquium im Institut für Europäische Geschichte vom 24. - 27. Februar 1999

1613 births
1681 deaths
People from Langewiesen
People from Schwarzburg-Sondershausen
German Lutheran theologians
17th-century Latin-language writers
University of Erfurt alumni
Academic staff of the University of Jena
17th-century German Protestant theologians
German male non-fiction writers
17th-century German writers
17th-century German male writers
17th-century Lutheran theologians